Acraga neblina is a moth of the family Dalceridae. It is found in Venezuela. The habitat consists of tropical premontane wet and tropical lower montane rain forests, where it is found at high altitudes.

The length of the forewings is 14–17 mm. Adults are light orange, except for the dorsal forewings, which are deep orange with light orange veins. Adults are on wing in May, August and December.

References

Dalceridae
Moths described in 1994
Moths of South America